Human genetic enhancement or human genetic engineering refers to human enhancement by means of a genetic modification. This could be done in order to cure diseases (gene therapy), prevent the possibility of getting a particular disease (similarly to vaccines),  to improve athlete performance in sporting events (gene doping), or to change physical appearance, metabolism, and even improve physical capabilities and mental faculties such as memory and intelligence.
These genetic enhancements may or may not be done in such a way that the change is heritable (which has raised concerns within the scientific community).

Gene therapy

Genetic modification in order to cure genetic diseases is referred to as gene therapy. Many such gene therapies are available, made it through all phases of clinical research and are approved by the FDA. Since that time, drugs such as Novartis' Zolgensma and Alnylam's Patisiran have also received FDA approval, in addition to other companies' gene therapy drugs. Most of these approaches utilize adeno-associated viruses (AAVs) and lentiviruses for performing gene insertions, in vivo and ex vivo, respectively. ASO / siRNA approaches such as those conducted by Alnylam and Ionis Pharmaceuticals require non-viral delivery systems, and utilize alternative mechanisms for trafficking to liver cells by way of GalNAc transporters.

Disease prevention

Some people are immunocompromised and their bodies are hence much less capable of fending off and defeating diseases (i.e. influenza, ...). In some cases this is due to genetic flaws or even genetic diseases such as SCID. Some gene therapies have already been developed or are being developed to correct these genetic flaws/diseases, hereby making these people less susceptible to catching additional diseases (i.e. influenza, ...).

In November 2018, Lulu and Nana were created. By using clustered regularly interspaced short palindromic repeat (CRISPR)-Cas9, a gene editing technique, they disabled a gene called CCR5 in the embryos, aiming to close the protein doorway that allows HIV to enter a cell and make the subjects immune to the HIV virus.

Gene doping

Athletes might adopt gene therapy technologies to improve their performance. Gene doping is not known to occur, but multiple gene therapies may have such effects. Kayser et al. argue that gene doping could level the playing field if all athletes receive equal access. Critics claim that any therapeutic intervention for non-therapeutic/enhancement purposes compromises the ethical foundations of medicine and sports.

Other uses 
Other hypothetical gene therapies could include changes to physical appearance, metabolism, mental faculties such as memory and intelligence, and well-being (by increasing resistance to depression or relieving chronic pain, for example).

Physical appearance 

Some congenital disorders (such as those affecting the muscoskeletal system) may affect physical appearance, and in some cases may also cause physical discomfort. Modifying the genes causing these congenital diseases (on those diagnosed to have mutations of the gene known to cause these diseases) may prevent this.

Also changes in the mystatin gene may alter appearance.

Behavior 

Behavior may also be modified by genetic intervention. Some people may be aggressive, selfish, and may not be able to function well in society. There is currently research ongoing on genes that are or may be (in part) responsible for selfishness (e.g. ruthlessness gene), aggression (e.g. warrior gene), altruism (e.g. OXTR, CD38, COMT, DRD4, DRD5, IGF2, GABRB2)

There is some research going on on the hypothetical treatment of psychiatric disorders by means of gene therapy. It is assumed that, with gene-transfer techniques, it is possible (in experimental settings using animal models) to alter CNS gene expression and thereby the intrinsic generation of molecules involved in neural plasticity and neural regeneration, and thereby modifying ultimately behaviour.

In recent years, it was possible to modify ethanol intake in animal models. Specifically, this was done by targeting the expression of the aldehyde dehydrogenase gene (ALDH2), lead to a significantly altered alcohol-drinking behaviour. Reduction of p11, a serotonin receptor binding protein, in the nucleus accumbens led to depression-like behaviour in rodents, while restoration of the p11 gene expression in this anatomical area reversed this behaviour.

Recently, it was also shown that the gene transfer of CBP (CREB (c-AMP response element binding protein) binding protein) improves cognitive deficits in an animal model of Alzheimer's dementia via increasing the expression of BDNF (brain-derived neurotrophic factor). The same authors were also able to show in this study that accumulation of amyloid-β (Aβ) interfered with CREB activity which is physiologically involved in memory formation.

In another study, it was shown that Aβ deposition and plaque formation can be reduced by sustained expression of the neprilysin (an endopeptidase) gene which also led to improvements on the behavioural (i.e. cognitive) level.

Similarly, the intracerebral gene transfer of ECE (endothelin-converting enzyme) via a virus vector stereotactically injected in the right anterior cortex and hippocampus, has also shown to reduce Aβ deposits in a transgenic mouse model of Alzeimer's dementia.

There is also research going on on genoeconomics, a protoscience that is based on the idea that a person's financial behavior could be traced to their DNA and that genes are related to economic behavior. , the results have been inconclusive. Some minor correlations have been identified.

Databases about potential modifications
George Church has compiled a list of potential genetic modifications based on scientific studies for possibly advantageous traits such as less need for sleep, cognition-related changes that protect against Alzheimer's disease, disease resistances, higher lean muscle mass and enhanced learning abilities along with some of the associated studies and potential negative effects.

See also 
 Biohappiness
 Crossbreeding
 Directed evolution (transhumanism)
 Designer baby
 Epigenetics
 Genetic screening: allows detecting personal genetic weaknesses to be addressed
 Genetic factors of addiction
 Procreative beneficence
 New eugenics
 Life extension

References 

Emerging technologies
 
Biological engineering
Body modification
Biotechnology
Molecular biology
Engineering disciplines